The 1869 County Louth by-election was contested on 11 January 1869.  The by-election was held because the incumbent Liberal MP, Chichester Fortescue, had become the Chief Secretary for Ireland.  Under the law at the time if an MP attained certain government positions, they were required to resign their seat and run for it again. The seat was retained by Fortescue.

References

By-elections to the Parliament of the United Kingdom in County Louth constituencies
1869 elections in the United Kingdom
January 1869 events
1869 elections in Ireland